Nurhan Fırat (born September 4, 1972 in Istanbul , Turkey) is a Turkish female karateka competing in the kumite +60 kg and open divisions. She was twice European champion. Daughters-> Sâra Melike Celik, Erva Zehra Celik, Esma Mina Celik, Eslem Hafsa Celik. 

https://instagram.com/nurhanfirat24?igshid=YmMyMTA2M2Y=

Achievements

See also
 Turkish women in sports

References

Living people
Turkish female karateka
Turkish female martial artists
1972 births
People from Erzincan
World Games medalists in karate
Competitors at the 1993 World Games
World Games silver medalists
20th-century Turkish sportswomen
21st-century Turkish sportswomen